Fehrite is a hydroxyl-bearing, hydrated, copper-magnesium sulfate mineral approved by the International Mineralogical Association as a new species in 2019,  and formally described in 2021 from specimens obtained from the Casualidad mine, located near Baños de Sierra Alhamilla, in Pechina (Almería), Spain, which is consequently the type locality. The name is a tribute to Karl Thomas Fehr, Professor of Mineralogy at the Ludwig Maximilian University in Munich (Germany).

Properties 
Fehrite is the only magnesium copper sulfate known so far. It is isostructural with ktenasite and gobelinite, with magnesium in place of zinc and cobalt. It is found as radiating aggregates of elongated, tabular, ribbon-like crystals with a maximum length of 200 μm. In addition to the elements of the formula, its composition includes significant proportions of Zn and traces of Mn.

Deposits 
Fehrite is a secondary mineral, which is produced by alteration of sulfides. It seems to be a very rare mineral, and so far, it has only been found in two localities: At the type locality, the Casualidad mine, in Pechina (Almeria), Spain, it was found as an alteration product of tetrahedrite.  It is associated with kapellasite, connellite and serpierite. Its appearance is very similar to serpierite, from which it can be differentiated by the presence of slight greenish tones in the fehrite, while the colour of serpierite is sky blue, without green tones. It has also been found in the Les Ferreres mine, Rocabruna, Camprodón (Gerona), Spain.

References 

Copper(II) minerals
Sulfate minerals
Magnesium minerals
Minerals described in 2021